Edward Emory Leamer (born May 24, 1944) is a professor of economics and statistics at UCLA. He is Chauncey J. Medberry Professor of Management and director of the UCLA Anderson Forecast.

He attended Princeton (B.A., mathematics, 1966) and the University of Michigan (M.A., mathematics, Ph.D., economics, 1970).

Leamer is the author of 4 books and over 100 articles on a range of subjects especially including applied econometrics and quantitative international economics.

Leamer was the vice presidential nominee on Laurence Kotlikoff's independent ticket in the 2016 US presidential election.

Leamer is known amongst economists for his paper "Let's Take the Con Out of Econometrics", widely referred to as Leamer's critique, which is said to have catalyzed the implementation of more rigorous research designs in the economic sciences.

Selected publications
Books
 1978. Specification Searches: Ad Hoc Inference with Nonexperimental Data, Wiley. Chapter preview links.
 1985. Sources of International Comparative Advantage: Theory and Evidence, MIT Press. Description.
 2006. Quantitative International Economics (with Robert M. Stern). Aldine Transaction. Description and preview.
 2007. Handbook of Econometrics, Elsevier. Description and chapter-preview links for v. 6A & 6B (editor with James J. Heckman).
 2009. Macroeconomic Patterns and Stories, Springer.  Description and preview.

Articles
 1980. "The Leontief Paradox, Reconsidered," Journal of Political Economy, 88(3), pp. 495-503. Reprinted in Jagdish N. Bhagwati, ed., 1987, International Trade: Selected Readings, MIT Press. pp. 115- 124.
 1983a. "Let's Take the Con Out of Econometrics," American Economic Review, 73(1), pp. 31-43.
 1983b. "Reporting the Fragility of Regression Estimates," (with Herman Leonard), Review of Economics and Statistics, 65(2), pp. 306-317.
 1985. "Sensitivity Analyses Would Help," American Economic Review, 75(3), pp. 308-313.
  1995. "International Trade Theory: The Evidence," ch. 26, Handbook of International Economics, v. 3, pp. 1339–1394. Abstract.
 1987. "Econometric Metaphors," in Advances in Econometrics, Truman F. Bewley, ed., Cambridge v. 2, pp. 1-28.
 1999. "Effort, Wages and the International Division of Labor," Journal of Political Economy, Vol. 107, Number 6, Part 1. 
 2001. "The Economic Geography of the Internet Age," Journal of International Business Studies, 32,4. 
 2007a. "Housing is the Business Cycle," in Housing, Housing Finance, and Monetary Policy, Federal Reserve Bank of Kansas City, pp. 149-233.
 2007b. "Linking the Theory with the Data: That is the Core Problem of International Economics," ch. 67, Handbook of Econometrics, v. 6A, pp 4587–4606. Abstract.
 2007c. "A Flat World, A Level Playing Field, A Small World After All, or None of the Above? A Review of Thomas L. Friedman's The World is Flat," Journal of Economic Literature. 
 2008. From The New Palgrave Dictionary of Economics. 2nd Edition. Abstract links:
 "extreme bounds analysis"
 "Leontief paradox"
 "specification problems in econometrics".
 2010. "Tantalus on the Road to Asymptopia," Journal of Economic Perspectives, 24(2), pp. 31-46.

References

External links
 
 
 Ed Leamer on The Accad and Koka Report Podcast

1944 births
Living people
21st-century American economists
Econometricians
Princeton University alumni
University of Michigan alumni
University of California, Los Angeles faculty
Fellows of the Econometric Society
Fellows of the American Academy of Arts and Sciences